Isaac Collins may refer to:

 Isaac Collins (printer) (1746–1817), colonial printer, publisher, bookseller and merchant
 Isaac Clinton Collins (1824–1879), American politician
 Isaac J. Collins (1874–1975), American businessman, founder of the Anchor Hocking
 Isaac Collins (American football), American gridiron football coach and player